Karl August Koberstein (also August Karl Koberstein; 10 January 1797, Rügenwalde – 8 March 1870, Pforta) was a German literary historian.

Biography
He studied at Stolpe and Potsdam, then (1812) at Berlin. He was appointed professor at Schulpforta, where he was actively engaged till his death.

Work
His literary career commenced with his work entitled Ueber das wahrscheinliche Alter und die Bedeutung des Gedichts vom Wartburgkrieg (On the apparent age and significance of the poem on the Wartburg War; 1823). He wrote, notably, Grundriss der Geschichte der deutschen National-literatur (Outline of the history of German literature; 1827), which, in its fourth revision (1847–66), became a comprehensive history of German national literature. This work was extended, after his death, in a fifth edition by Karl Bartsch (Leipzig, 1872–75). His other works include Vermischte Aufsätze zur Literaturgeschichte und Aesthetik (Miscellaneous essays on literary history and aesthetics; Leipzig, 1858), Heinrich von Kleists Briefe an seine Schwester Ulrike (Heinrich von Kleist's letters to his sister Ulrike; Berlin, 1860). He contributed to Löbell's Entwicklung der deutschen Poesie (Development of German poetry), the volume on Lessing (1865).

Family
His son Karl Koberstein was a noted dramatist.

Notes

References
 
Attribution

1797 births
1870 deaths
German literary historians
Humboldt University of Berlin alumni
German male non-fiction writers
People from Darłowo
Members of the Göttingen Academy of Sciences and Humanities